Orman is a village in the municipality of Ohrid, North Macedonia.

Demographics
As of the 2021 census, Orman had 119 residents with the following ethnic composition:
Macedonians 106
Persons for whom data are taken from administrative sources 11
Albanians 2

According to the 2002 census, the village had a total of 104 inhabitants. Ethnic groups in the village include:
Macedonians 104

References

Villages in Ohrid Municipality